Virola parvifolia is a species of plant in the family Myristicaceae. It is endemic to Brazil, Colombia and Venezuela.

It is a tree between 4–14 m tall with simple elliptical leaves 5–11 cm long by 3–5 cm wide.  The density of its wood is 0.42 g/cm3.

References

parvifolia
Flora of Brazil
Flora of Colombia
Flora of Venezuela
Vulnerable plants
Taxonomy articles created by Polbot